Xiomara De Oliver (born 1967) is a Canadian-born Black artist. She is known for her paintings, which explore the concerns of Black women. She is based in Marina del Rey, California.

Biography  
Xiomara De Oliver was born in 1967 in Grand Forks, British Columbia in Canada. She attended California State University, Sacramento, and graduated in 1988 with a degree in criminal law. In 1997, De Oliver graduated with a degree in studio art and environmental art from New York University (NYU). In 2006 De Oliver was the recipient of a Joan Mitchell Foundation grant.

De Oliver's artwork explores the physical and political condition of Black and African American women. She often paints in an abstract expressionist-style. Her work is included in public museum collections including Museum of Modern Art, and the Studio Museum in Harlem.

References 

1967 births
Living people
20th-century Canadian women artists
21st-century Canadian women artists
Artists from British Columbia
People from Marina del Rey, California
California State University, Sacramento alumni
New York University alumni
Black Canadian artists
African-American women artists
21st-century African-American people
20th-century African-American people
20th-century African-American women
21st-century African-American women